is a Japanese sprint canoeist. Competing in the individual 200 m event he won a silver medal at the 2017 Asian Championships and a bronze at the 2014 Asian Games.

Komatsu took up canoeing aged 13 in Miyagi Prefecture. Besides training himself, he coaches high school students, and works for the Ehime Prefecture National Sporting Performance. In 2017 he was banned from competitions for doping, but the ban was lifted next year when it was found that his rival Yasuhiro Suzuki intentionally added an anabolic steroid into Komatsu's drink.

References

Japanese male canoeists
1992 births
Living people
Canoeists at the 2014 Asian Games
Canoeists at the 2018 Asian Games
Medalists at the 2014 Asian Games
Asian Games medalists in canoeing
Asian Games bronze medalists for Japan